Sphingonaepiopsis gorgoniades, the Gorgon hawkmoth, is a moth of the family Sphingidae. The species was first described by Jacob Hübner in 1819. It is found from Croatia, Albania, Macedonia, central and southern Greece, eastern Bulgaria and Romania across southern Ukraine and the Crimea, southern Russia as far north as Kazan, the southern Urals and eastern Kazakhstan to Kyrgyzstan and Afghanistan. It has also been recorded from central and southern Turkey, Lebanon, Israel and western Jordan eastward across northern Iraq, the Caucasus (Armenia, Georgia and Azerbaijan), northern Iran to southern Turkmenistan.

The wingspan is 25–32 mm. There are two generations per year with adults on wing in late May and early June and again in late July/August. In the southern Urals, adults have been recorded from late May to mid-July, with a partial second generation from late July to early August.

The larvae feed on Galium species, mainly Galium verum and other Rubiaceae species.

External links

Sphingonaepiopsis
Moths described in 1819
Moths of Europe
Moths of Asia